Kabataş may refer to:

Kabataş, Beyoğlu, a quarter in the European part of Istanbul, Turkey
Kabataş (Istanbul Metro), a funicular railway station
Kabataş, Çine, a village in Aydın Province, Turkey
Kabataş, Kemaliye, a village in Erzincan Province, Turkey
Kabataş, Ordu, a town and district of Ordu Province, Turkey
Kabataş Erkek Lisesi, a historic high school in the Ortaköy neighborhood of Istanbul, Turkey